Irungbam Surkumar Singh (born 21 March 1983) is an Indian footballer who played for India national football team graduated out of the prestigious Tata Football Academy in 2000 and was signed on by East Bengal FC and now he plays for United Sikkim F.C. in the 2nd Division of the I-League. He is an Indian footballer who plays as a defender for India.After impressing at under-16 level while playing for Manipur under-16 despite being only 13, Surkumar was hired by Tata Football Academy. He spent four years in TFA and used to play as a center back. 
He also made his international debut in 2001 in the historic 1-0 win over UAE in a 2002 World Cup qualifier.

Career

East Bengal
After signing his first professional contract with East Bengal, he was turned into a right back by then-East Bengal coach Syed Nayemuddin. That change brought the best out of Surkumar as he played a key role in East Bengal’s first ever National League title.

Mahindra United
After just one season with the red and gold brigade, he joined Mahindra United. He won the Durand Cup with the Mumbai-based outfit but also tore his ligament there in a Mumbai League match.

East Bengal
Surkumar returned to East Bengal for his second spell and won the treble with them in 2003 - ASEAN Cup, National Football League (NFL) and Kolkata Premier League.

Mahindra United
Surkumar then joined Mahindra for the second time in his career and spent three successful seasons with the Mumbai club. The fullback won every major trophy with the Red Devils of India and was adjudged AIFF Player of the Year in 2006.

East Bengal
He rejoined East Bengal for this third spell and won the Federation Cup in 2007.

Mohun Bagan
Then in 2009, for the first time in his career Surkumar signed for Mohun Bagan. He had scored the only goal from a Snehasish Chakraborty corner, as debutantes Shillong Lajong F.C. had thrashed the century-old club 1-4 at Kolkata.

Mumbai Tigers
In the 2013 I-League 2nd Division, he had opened the scoring for the Mumbai Tigers F.C. in their last match against Bhawanipore F.C. in the 3-5 loss.

He won the Kolkata League with Mohun Bagan in his first season and will be an important player for them once he returns from international duty. For the national team, Surkumar has been a regular since the 2005 SAFF Cup triumph. The attacking right wingback has easily been India’s best player in that position in the last decade. Unlike very few fullbacks in the country, Surkumar also has the ability to score goals, especially from long range. He has four international goals to his name with the most recent one coming in the 3-6 defeat against Yemen in Pune.

United Sikkim F.C.
In 2014, he has joined United Sikkim F.C.

Honours
East Bengal
IFA Shield: 2000
ASEAN Club Championship: 2003

India
 AFC Challenge Cup: 2008
 SAFF Championship: 2005
 Nehru Cup: 2007, 2009

Individual
 AIFF Player of the Year: 2006

References

External links
 

Indian footballers
India international footballers
India youth international footballers
1983 births
Living people
Meitei people
Footballers from Manipur
People from Imphal
2011 AFC Asian Cup players
I-League players
Mahindra United FC players
Mumbai Tigers FC players
East Bengal Club players
Mohun Bagan AC players
United Sikkim F.C. players
Association football fullbacks
Footballers at the 2006 Asian Games
Asian Games competitors for India